The women's 100 metres hurdles event at the 2009 Summer Universiade was held on 9–10 July.

Medalists

Results

Heats
Qualification: First 3 of each heat (Q) and the next 4 fastest (q) qualified for the semifinals.

Wind:Heat 1: 0.0 m/s, Heat 2: +1.6 m/s, Heat 3: +0.4 m/s, Heat 4: +0.6 m/s

Semifinals
Qualification: First 3 of each semifinal (Q) and the next 2 fastest (q) qualified for the finals.

Wind:Heat 1: +0.5 m/s, Heat 2: −0.3 m/s

Final
Wind: +1.5 m/s

References
 Results (archived)

100 M Hurdles
2009 in women's athletics
2009